OGE may refer to:

 Oklahoma Gas & Electric
 United States Office of Government Ethics
 Out of Ground Effect, related to hovering a helicopter, see Ground effect in aircraft
 Oilthigh na Gàidhealtachd 's nan Eilean, Gaelic name of University of the Highlands and Islands
 The Ontario Global Edge Program, an international work placement program funded by the government of Ontario, Canada

People:
 Oge Okoye, Nigerian actress
 Vincent Ogé, Haitian revolutionary

See also
 Ogee